"Fat and Thin" is a satirical short story by Anton Chekhov,  first published in the No. 40, 1 October 1883 issue of Oskolki magazine, signed A. Chekhonte (А. Чехонте). It was included into Chekhov's 1886 collection Motley Stories (Пёстрые рассказы) published in Saint Petersburg and later in the Volume 1 of the Adolf Marks's Chekhov's Collected Works (1899).

History 
The plot of the short story "Fat and Thin" in its original version was based on an anecdote, and the conflict between the characters arose accidentally, due to the involuntary oversight of the "Thin".

The 1886 edition, being in general textually close to the previous edition of 1883, changed the meaning of the story. The motive of official subordination was eliminated: the "Thin" now grovels before the "Fat" without any practical need, "reflexively". The story also received a much greater satirical sharpness and generality.

Characters 
Main characters:
 Misha ― the Fat
 Porphyry ― the Thin
Minor characters:
 Louise ― is the wife of Porphyry
 Nathanael ― is the son of Porphyry

Plot 
At a railway station the fat one, Mischa, accidentally meets the thin one, Porfiri. The thin man travels accompanied by his wife and son. The two old school friends greet each other in an exuberant and informal manner. A conversation follows, and it is about careers of both of them as government officials. The thin one appears to be an office chairman with a low salary, and his wife gives music lessons.

The Fat has become a Privy Council and has a greater authority than the Thin. The Thin shrinks, and at once addresses to his school friend as "Your Excellency." The Thick rejects "this respect". The thin man continues to talk in a formal way with his old friend. The Privy Councilor is repelled by such submissiveness: he says goodbye and leaves.

In culture 
 The story was adapted into a movie of the same name in 1955.
 A monument to the characters of the story was installed in Taganrog on May 13, 2011 in front of the Museum of Chekhovs' Works (sculptor David Begalov).
 A monument to the characters of the story is set in Yuzhno-Sakhalinsk in 2013, in the park near the Sakhalin International Theater Center.

References

External links
 Толстый и тонкий, the original Russian text
 Fat and Thin, the English Translation

Short stories by Anton Chekhov
1883 short stories
Short stories adapted into films
Works originally published in Russian magazines